Katrin Weber (born 27 September 1976) is a German short track speed skater. She competed in the women's 3000 metre relay event at the 1998 Winter Olympics.

References

External links
 

1976 births
Living people
German female short track speed skaters
Olympic short track speed skaters of Germany
Short track speed skaters at the 1998 Winter Olympics
Sportspeople from Rostock
20th-century German women